Smidovich is an urban locality (an urban-type settlement) and the administrative center of Smidovichsky District of the Jewish Autonomous Oblast, Russia. Population:

History
It is an early Jewish settlement, which was founded in 1928 named after Pyotr Smidovich who, along with Mikhail Kalinin, came up with the idea to found the Jewish Autonomous Oblast.

Climate
Like most of the Amur Basin, Smidovich has an extreme humid continental climate (Köppen Dwb), featuring very warm and rainy summers contrasting with frigid and very dry winters.

Sport
The bandy club Urozhay played in the Russian Bandy Supreme League, the second highest division, until 2015–16. Its home arena was the Lokomotiv Stadium.

See also
History of the Jews in the Jewish Autonomous Oblast

References

Urban-type settlements in the Jewish Autonomous Oblast
Historic Jewish communities